North Carolina's 31st Senate district is one of 50 districts in the North Carolina Senate. It has been represented by Republican Joyce Krawiec since 2014.

Geography
Since 2023, the district has included all of Stokes County, as well as part of Forsyth County. The district overlaps with the 71st, 72nd, 75th, and 91st state house districts.

District officeholders

Election results

2022

2020

2018

2016

2014

2012

2010

2008

2006

2004

2002

2000

References

North Carolina Senate districts
Stokes County, North Carolina
Forsyth County, North Carolina